The Kawasaki Heavy Industries & CRRC Qingdao Sifang CT251 is the first generation electric multiple unit rolling stock in operation on the Thomson–East Coast line of Singapore's Mass Rapid Transit (MRT) system, manufactured by a consortium of Kawasaki Heavy Industries (KHI) and CRRC Qingdao Sifang (formerly CSR Qingdao Sifang) under Contract T251.

91 four-car medium-capacity trainsets were purchased by LTA for the Thomson-East Coast line and the first set was delivered on 25 May 2018.

Seven additional trains were supposed to be procured for the RTS Link as both the Singapore and Malaysian governments agreed to both lines sharing largely identical technical specifications. Since then, a new agreement signed on 30 July 2020 meant that these trains would not be built and will be replaced by LRT trains.

Tender 
The tender for trains under the contract turnkey 251 was closed on 15 November 2013 with six bids. The Land Transport Authority has shortlisted all of them and the tender results were published on 28 May 2014.

Kawasaki will be responsible for the overall project management, design, manufacturing of bogies and procurement of major components. CRRC Qingdao Sifang will be in charge of manufacturing, final fitting and assembly of complete MRT trains and factory testing. Kawasaki (Singapore) will be responsible for the delivery of complete MRT trains to the depot, on-site testing and commissioning.

Design and features

The CT251 trains have a new livery of yellow and brown stripes running around the cars, similar to C951(A) trains, which bear teal and blue stripes. They include several features unique to this rolling stock, such as:

 LTA's new passenger information display, which is Train Vision supplied by Mitsubishi Electric;
 Perch seats which are located at the ends of each train car;
 Tip-up seats in 60 of the 91 trainsets;
 10 doors per car (5 per side)

Two of the CT251 trains would also be fitted with the automatic track inspection system, comprising cameras, lasers and sensors which would help to detect defects on the tracks, such as rail cracks, missing track-rail fasteners or even foreign objects.

Train formation
The configuration of a CT251 in revenue service is DM1–M–T–DM2.

Kawasaki and CRRC Qingdao Sifang (formerly CSR Qingdao Sifang) built sets 2001~2091.

The car numbers of the trains range from 2001x to 2091x, where x depends on the carriage type. Individual cars are assigned a five-digit serial number. A complete four-car trainset consists of one trailer (T), one motor car (M) and two driving motor cars (DM1 & DM2) permanently coupled together.

 The first digit is always a 2.
 The second digit is always a 0.
 The third digit and fourth digit identifies the set number.
 The fifth digit identifies the car number, where the first car has a 1, the second has a 2, the third has a 3 and the fourth has a 4.
For example, set 2005 consists of carriages 20051, 20052, 20053 and 20054.

Doubts about the consortium 

The award of the CT251 turnkey contract to the Kawasaki Heavy Industries & CRRC Qingdao Sifang (formerly CSR Qingdao Sifang) consortium was briefly politicised in Singapore, when the defects from the relatively new C151A trains constructed by the same consortium were made public on 5 July 2016. This was after Gerald Giam from the Workers Party commenting through an official Facebook post doubting the decision by the Land Transport Authority to awarded the subsequent contracts, specifically both the design and supply of C151C and CT251 rail cars to the same consortium in 2015. This was despite the Land Transport Authority and operator SMRT Trains being officially acknowledged on the C151A crack defects as early as 2013.

References

External links

Mass Rapid Transit (Singapore) rolling stock
Kawasaki multiple units
Train-related introductions in 2020
750 V DC multiple units
CRRC multiple units